Rico Elmer (born 23 July 1969) is a Swiss ski mountaineer and mountain runner.

Elmer was born in village of Elm in the canton of Glarus. He first competed in the Patrouille des Glaciers event in 1996 and has been member of the national team since 2003. Professionally he is deployed in the Border Guard Corps.

Selected results 
 2000:
 1st and course record, Tour de Matterhorn (together with Emanuel Buchs and Damien Farquet)
 2002:
 1st, Patrouille de la Maya A-course, together with Damien Farquet and Rolf Zurbrügg
 2003:
 1st, Trophée des Gastlosen, together with Damien Farquet
 1st, European Championship team race (together with Damien Farquet)
 3rd, European Championship combination ranking
 4th, European Championship single race
 2004:
 1st, World Championship single race
 3rd, World Championship relay race (together with Alexander Hug, Alain Richard and Pierre Bruchez)
 3rd, Transcavallo race (together with Damien Farquet)
 2006:
 3rd, World Championship relay race (together with Alexander Hug, Alain Rey and Florent Troillet)
 3rd, European Cup race in Albosaggia (together with Florent Troillet)
 3rd, Swiss Championship vertical race
 4th, World Championship team race (together with Alexander Hug)

Patrouille des Glaciers 

 1998: 1st, together with Pvt E-2 Damien Farquet and Pvt E-2 Emanuel Buchs
 2000: 1st and course record, together with Pvt E-2 Damien Farquet and Pvt E-2 Emanuel Buchs
 2004: 3rd, together with Damien Farquet and Rolf Zurbrügg
 2006: 3rd (and 1st in international military teams ranking), together with Pvt E-2 Florent Troillet and Pvt E-2 Yannick Ecoeur
 2008: 5th ("seniors I" class ranking), mixed team together with Sophie Dusautoir Bertrand and Marie Troillet
 2010: 3rd, together with Jean-Daniel Masserey and Jean-Yves Rey

Trofeo Mezzalama 

 2001: 4th, together with Damien Farquet and Emanuel Buchs
 2003: 1st, together with Damien Farquet and Rolf Zurbrügg

Pierra Menta 

 2003: 6th, together with Damien Farquet

External links 
 Rico Elmer at skimountaineering.com

References 

1969 births
Living people
Swiss male ski mountaineers
World ski mountaineering champions
Swiss military patrol (sport) runners
Swiss mountain runners
People from the canton of Glarus